A post road is a road designated for the transportation of postal mail. In past centuries, only major towns had a post house and the roads used by post riders or mail coaches to carry mail among them were particularly important ones or, due to the special attention given them, became so. In various centuries and countries, post road became more or less equivalent to main road, royal road, or highway. The 20th century spread of postal service blurred the distinction.

Asia
Great Post Road, from Anyer to Panarukan, Indonesia, was  a notable post road in Asia, built during the governancy of Herman Willem Daendels of Dutch East Indies from 1808 to 1811.

Europe

Notable post roads in Europe include:
 Antwerp-Venice Post Road, similar to the Dutch Post Road.
 Bremen-Hamburg Post Road, approved by the king of Sweden on July 5, 1665 to establish regular mail service. A second route was routed from Cuxhaven through the Land of Wursten to Lehe.
 Dutch Post Road, established in 1490, connected the Netherlands with coaching inns in Germany and Italy.

North America
The following are notable posts roads in Canada and the U.S.

Canada 

Chemin du Roy was built between Montreal (Repentigny) and Quebec City from 1731 to 1737, for mail and as a means of travel for the key settlements in New France/Lower Canada. It was later incorporated as Quebec Route 2 and is now part of Quebec Route 138.

Two notable post roads built in the late 1700s and early 1800s were Dundas Road (The Governor's Road) and Kingston Road (Lakeshore Road or York Road) to provide a route for mail and stagecoaches between key settlements in Upper Canada.

The latter route, which became The Provincial Highway in 1917 (Ontario Highway 2 c. 1923), and the former which became a Dundas Highway in 1920 (Ontario Highway 5 in 1925), were the beginning of the provincial highway system in Ontario.

United States
In what was to later become the United States, post roads developed as the primary method of communicating information across and between the colonies.

The Articles of Confederation authorized the national government to create post offices but not post roads. Adoption of the U.S. Constitution changed this, as Article I, Section Eight, known as the Postal Clause, specifically authorizes Congress the enumerated power "to establish post offices and post roads." This was generally interpreted liberally, to include all public highways. U.S. Supreme Court justice Joseph Story defended the broad interpretation that had become dominant in his influential Commentaries on the Constitution of the United States (1833).

Notable American post roads built for the purpose include:
 Albany Post Road, which connects New York City to Albany, the capital of New York State
 Boston Post Road, which traverses New England from New York City to Boston, Massachusetts
 White Plains Post Road, the southernmost section of New York State Route 22, known as the White Plains Post Road in the 18th and 19th centuries, was a major highway connecting New York City to White Plains, Westchester's county seat.

References

External links
Justice Joseph Story, Commentaries on the Constitution of the United States, 3 vols, (Boston: 1833)

Legal history of the United States
Postal systems
Types of roads